The Fellowship of Independent Evangelical Churches (FIEC) is a network of 639 independent evangelical churches mainly in the United Kingdom.

History 
The FIEC was formed in 1922 under the name A Fellowship of Undenominational and Unattached Churches and Missions. It was later renamed The Fellowship of Independent Evangelical Churches. The Fellowship brought together many independent churches and mission halls, which had been somewhat isolated.

Statistics 
By February 2021, the FIEC has come to include 639 churches across Great Britain and the Channel Islands and 50,000 members.

Beliefs 
The FIEC is in the Independent Evangelical tradition. According to the National Director of FIEC, "An ‘Independent’ church is self-governing. Each individual local church has ultimate control over its own affairs. It does not belong to any external body or institution which has control over it." The FIEC leadership claims it exercises 'something comparable to the sub-apostolic' ministry of Timothy and Titus. Some trace the routes of Independency to separatists, such as Robert Browne in the time of Elizabeth I and James I of England, but "separatism" may be an unhelpful term to use in the present day to describe FIEC, because although a church has to be autonomous and self-governing to affiliate to the FIEC, one of the main purposes of the FIEC is that local churches should work together to share resources as they seek to advance the Christian Faith. However, it is correct to note that a number of churches joined FIEC when they separated from a denomination that moved away from what they considered to be historic orthodox biblical Christianity. For example, Westminster Chapel, a leading church in the Independent tradition, joined the FIEC when the Congregational Union merged with the English Presbyterian Church to form the United Reformed Church denomination (URC). Many Independent churches within the FIEC are Baptist churches but the FIEC is open both to churches that only baptise adults and also to churches that baptise the children of believers.

The FIEC believes the classical Complementarian view which recognises that the distinctive calling to be a pastor or elder in the local church, and to be the head of the home, is a calling for men.  It also recognises and encourages a wide calling of ministries within the church for women and men.

FIEC Practical Services 
FIEC Limited is a registered charity and trust corporation working under the title FIEC Practical Services.  It holds church property in trust for many churches and also provides legal advice to churches and other charities. In most cases where it holds property in trust for churches, its role is limited to acting in accordance with the lawful instructions of the church for which it holds the property, although in some cases, it does also have decision making powers concerning the use of the property.

Leadership 
The FIEC is led by a team of directors. The senior director is the National Director, John Stevens. Other directors are Adrian Reynolds (Training), Andy Patterson (Mission), Johnny Prime (Pastoral), Andy Hunter (Scotland), Gemma Adam (Practical Services) and Trevor Archer (London).

Relations with other churches 
FIEC is the largest corporate partner of Affinity, which was previously called the British Evangelical Council.

They also believe that Ecumenism in the form of Churches Together is not a positive move, citing various reasons including the liberal stance of other churches. The Trust Board has recently affirmed that formal membership of Churches Together (CT) is inconsistent with the FIEC Statement on Ecumenism. However a number of fellowships publicly profess their affiliation to CT.

Issues raised by the Bible League Quarterly from 2009 to 2012 

Allegations of engagement in ecumenism by a missionary to Poland of Carey Baptist Church have also been made in articles in the July 2009 and January 2010 issues of the Bible League Quarterly, a journal once edited by the Fellowship's own founder, Rev E. J. Poole-Connor, which now has a circulation of just over 1000 copies per issue. This issue is regarded by some as controversial as it is alleged to be a violation of the Fellowship's own statement in 1996 opposing ecumenism. As an association of autonomous churches, the FIEC has defended the responsibility of Carey's elders to examine the allegations, but declined to examine them independently. The concerns were first raised in November 2008. On 23 March 2012 a modified statement on ecumenism was published, and the old withdrawn.
Further concerns about connections between prominent FIEC personalities and the Polish ecclesiastical scene were raised in 2012 by the same journal.

References

External links 

 
Evangelicalism in the United Kingdom
Market Harborough
Organisations based in Leicestershire
Religion in Leicestershire
Christian organizations established in 1922